"Purple" is the third release from Skin's second album Fake Chemical State. It has only been released on CD in The Netherlands. A download EP is available to most audiences. The CD single features live-acoustic tracks from a radio broadcast for NPO 3FM in The Netherlands.

Track listing

CD single

 Purple
 Just Let the Sun (Live Acoustic)
 Purple (Live Acoustic)
 Hedonism (Live Acoustic)

Download EP

 Purple
 Nothing But (Live Acoustic)
 Just Let the Sun (Live Acoustic)
 Purple (Live Acoustic)
 Hedonism (Live Acoustic)

2003 singles
Skin (musician) songs
2003 songs
Songs written by Skin (musician)
Songs written by Gary Clark (musician)
V2 Records singles